Nouba Khaled (11 December 1905 – 1943) was a French long-distance runner. He competed in the marathon at the 1936 Summer Olympics.

References

External links
 

1905 births
1943 deaths
Athletes (track and field) at the 1936 Summer Olympics
French male long-distance runners
French male marathon runners
Olympic athletes of France
Place of birth missing
20th-century French people